Jay Gordon is an American blues rock guitarist who recorded with Phillip Walker for his album Jaywalkin. Gordon has also played at the 2004 Crossroads Guitar Festival, sharing the stage with Eric Clapton, B.B. King, Jeff Beck and Carlos Santana.

Many journalists have praised Gordon for his instrument prowess, but there are also many critics who claim that despite his ability to play fast, he is too loud, his solos are too long and are performed in poor taste, one even saying "Gordon’s constant wailing solos that become long, self-indulgent and some of the most uneconomical guitar playing around and some poor lyrics that lack a sense of the blues."

Although though there many mixed views regarding Gordon's playing style and music, he is still a visible musician who has made many recordings, shares the stage with notable musicians and plays in many well known venues and events like, B.B. King's, Crossroads, and Las Vegas Bike Fest.

Early life 
Gordon was born in Charlotte, North Carolina and later raised in Chicago, Illinois, "where at an early age he was exposed to jazz and blues by his grandmother, who played the piano and organ." The young Gordon played various instruments but discovered the guitar at age 14 and played in Top 40 cover bands as a teenager. He met Albert Collins at a young age and cites him as an influence.

Critical reception

Negative reactions 
Electricblues.com has expressed that the album Electric Redemption, "...is heavy-duty, highly animated, guitar-driven blues and heavy rock that will send most traditional blues fans running for cover. Only those interested in seeing just how far the blues can be stretched need dwell here".

Positive reviews 
There are several positive reviews from critics, one saying, "This L.A. blues guitar player is a guy who has everyone else just trying to keep up as he pulls off endless incendiary guitar solos. This is Gordon's fourth album, with a fifth threatened for an early '99 release. Here's a guy who attracts guitar players who show up to watch and take notes. GRADE: A-" Regarding Gordon's album, Extremely Dangerous Blues, another reviewer expressed, "Although these performances are mostly fairly brief, there is no shortage of inventive ideas within the context of rockish Chicago blues, or any loss of passion." Other reviewers, view Gordon's larger-than-life playing to be ambitious, stating, "Gordon doesn't believe in understatement or simplicity. While his songs tell about overcoming heartache, being an outcast, partying all night long, and starting up a relationship, each one comes loaded with fire. The lyrics may be difficult to understand, but Gordon's powerhouse guitar leaves no doubt that he means business."

Recordings, personnel and sales rankings 

*For non-Billboard charting acts, such as Jay Gordon, the Amazon sales rank may indicate relative online popularity and is subject to change at any time.

See also 
 Chicago blues
 List of blues musicians
 :Category:American blues guitarists

References

American blues guitarists
People from Charlotte, North Carolina
American male guitarists
Year of birth missing (living people)
Living people